Golden Princess is a 2020 Burmese drama film, directed by Mee Pwar starring Pyay Ti Oo, Kyaw Kyaw Bo, Kaung Pyae, Zin Wine, Cho Pyone, May Thinzar Oo and Soe Pyae Thazin. The film, produced by  MMN Entertainment Film Production premiered Myanmar on February 13, 2020.

Cast
Pyay Ti Oo as Nyein Htoo
Soe Pyae Thazin as Shwe Yi
Kyaw Kyaw Bo as Oak Soe Kha
Kaung Pyae as Nay Ye
Zin Wine as U Kyaw Nyein
May Thinzar Oo as Daw Shwe Hmone
Cho Pyone

References

2020 films
2020s Burmese-language films
Films shot in Myanmar
2020 drama films
Burmese drama films